Bolān Pass is a valley and a natural gateway, through the Toba Kakar range in Balochistan province of Pakistan,  south of the Afghanistan border. The pass is an  stretch of the Bolan river valley from Rindli in the south to Darwāza near Kolpur in the north. It is made up of a number of narrow gorges and stretches. It connects Quetta with Sibi by road and railway.

Strategically located, traders, invaders, and nomadic tribes have also used it as a gateway to and from South Asia. The Bolān Pass is an important pass on the Baluch frontier, connecting Jacobabad and Jhang with Multan, which has always occupied an important place in the history of British campaigns in Afghanistan.

The local population south of the pass predominantly consists of Brahvi tribes, who extend from Bolan Pass to Cape Monze on the Arabian Sea. The ethnic group North of the pass consists of mainly Pashtuns, while to west are Baloch.

Geography

The Bolan Pass is in the Toba Kakar range, which lies south of the Hindu Kush mountain ranges. Bolan Pass is described as a pass over a lofty range that is full of ravines and gorges. The mountain ranges of the Bolan pass are the southern geographic border between the Indian plate and the Iranian plateau. The southern point of the pass, Near Dhadar, is the western bound of the Indus Valley and is seen as a great strategic point between Pakistan, Afghanistan, Iran and the Arabian Sea.

History 

The Bolan pass is the southern counterpart of the Khyber Pass, and both ranges have been used throughout history for invasions of the Indian subcontinent. In 1748, the Afghan king Ahmad Shah Durrani invaded India by using the Bolan Pass in addition to the traditional Khyber Pass route. The Durrani capital Qandahar was located nearby the pass, which gave quick access to Indian lands.

In 1837, threatened by a possible Russian invasion of South Asia via the Khyber and Bolān Passes, a British envoy was sent to Kabul to gain support of the Emir, Dost Mohammed. In February 1839 during the First Anglo-Afghan War, the British Army under Sir John Keane took 12,000 men through the Bolān Pass and entered Qandahar, which the Afghan Princes had abandoned; from there they would go on to attack and overthrow Ghazni.The pass they chose was not the same as that used by the modern railway line, but further west at Siri-Bolan.
A British officer of the Bengal Artillery described the Bolan Pass in 1841 in the words:
"The road through this pass leads, with few and rare exceptions, along what is the bed of a mountain-torrent, when filled by the melting of the snows or heavy rains, and is composed of loose shingly gravel, that recedes from under your feet, and is very difficult for draught: camels get on well. It is infested by the Kakurs, who live by robbery; and the hills sometimes close in upon the road, which is filled up by the bed of the stream, running through rocky chasms, upwards of a hundred feet high, from the top of which the robbers assail the travellers with stones; and were they as bold as they are cruel and perfidious, they might hold the place against all comers. Many spots were pointed out to me by the guides I had with me, as signalised by acts of violence, several European officers having lost their baggage during our occupation of the country. Should there be rain in the higher parts of the mountains, the stream at times comes down in an almost perpendicular volume, without warning, and sweeping all before it, as a friend of mine experienced, when he saw a party of men, horses, and camels, and all his property, borne down by it; when himself and some few men with him escaped by climbing up the nearly perpendicular side of the hill. About thirty-seven men were washed away upon that occasion."

In 1883, Sir Robert Groves Sandeman negotiated with the Khan of Kalat, Khudadad Khan, and secured British control over the pass in exchange for an annual fee.

Bolan Pass railway 

From Sibi the line runs south-west, skirting the hills to Rindli and originally followed the course of the Bolan stream to its head on the plateau. The destructive action of floods, however, led to the abandonment of this alignment, and the railway now follows the Mashkaf valley (which debouches into the plains close to Sibi), and is carried from near the head of the Mashkaf to a junction with the Bolan at Machh. An alternative route from Sibi to Quetta was found in the Harnai valley to the N.E. of Sibi, the line starting in exactly the opposite direction to that of the Bolān and entering the hills at Nari. The Harnai route, although longer, is the one adopted for all ordinary traffic, the Bolan loop being reserved for emergencies. At the Khundilani gorge of the Bolan route conglomerate cliffs, which rise to a height of 800 ft., enclose the valley.  At Siri Bolan the passage between the limestone rocks hardly admits of three persons riding abreast. The temperature of the pass in summer is very high, whereas in winter, near its head, the cold is extreme, and the ice-cold wind rushing down the narrow outlet becomes destructive to life. Since 1877, when the Quetta agency was founded, the pass was secured by the British Indian Army from militias of Baloch tribesmen (chiefly Marris).

See also
 Balochistan
 Kacchi Plain
 Mehrgarh
 Sulaiman Mountains

References

Geography of Pakistan
Mountain passes of Balochistan (Pakistan)
Mountain passes of Pakistan